Syntomodrillia iphis is an extinct species of sea snail, a marine gastropod mollusk in the family Drilliidae.

Description
The length of the shell attains 6.3 mm, its diameter 2 mm.

Distribution
This extinct species was found in Pliocene strata of Jamaica; age range: 3.6 to 2.588 Ma.

References

 A. J. W. Hendy, D. P. Buick, K. V. Bulinski, C. A. Ferguson, and A. I. Miller. 2008. Unpublished census data from Atlantic coastal plain and circum-Caribbean Neogene assemblages and taxonomic opinions

External links
 Fossilworks: Syntomodrillia iphis

iphis